Matthew Chubbe (died 1617), of Dorchester, Dorset, was an English politician.

He was a Member (MP) of the Parliament of England for Dorchester in 1601 and 1604.

References

16th-century births
1617 deaths
Members of the Parliament of England for Dorchester
English MPs 1601
English MPs 1604–1611